KMRC may refer to:

 Kolkata Metro Rail Corporation - a rapid transit system in Kolkata, India
 KMRC (AM) - a radio station in Louisiana, United States
 Kenya Mortgage Refinance Company - a Kenyan mortgage refinance lender.